Europa Island, in Malagasy Nosy Ampela is a  low-lying tropical atoll in the Mozambique Channel, about a third of the way from southern Madagascar to southern Mozambique. The island had never been inhabited until 1820, when the French family Rosier moved to it. The island officially became a possession of France in 1897.

The island, garrisoned by a detachment from Réunion, has a weather station and is visited by scientists.  Though uninhabited now, it is part of the Scattered Islands of the French Southern and Antarctic Lands administrative region.

Europa Island was the setting of "Search in the Deep", a 1968 episode of The Undersea World of Jacques Cousteau, partly focusing on the breeding habits of the green sea turtle.

Description 

There are no ports or harbours but anchorage is possible offshore. The airstrip is  metres long.

Ecology

The island is a nature reserve.  Its vegetation consists of dry forest, scrub, Euphorbia, the mangrove swamp, and the remains of a sisal plantation.  It is one of the world's largest nesting sites for green sea turtles. It is also home to goats introduced by settlers in the late 18th century.

The island has been identified as an Important Bird Area by BirdLife International because it supports a large and diverse population of breeding seabirds and other waterbirds.  It is the only known breeding site outside Aldabra and Madagascar for Malagasy pond herons. Seabirds include the second largest colony in the western Indian Ocean of great frigatebirds (with up to 1100 pairs), Audubon's shearwaters (up to 100 pairs, probably of the subspecies Puffinus lherminieri bailloni previously considered endemic to the Mascarene Islands), dimorphic egrets and Caspian terns.

Europa is home to an endemic subspecies of white-tailed tropicbird (Phaethon lepturus europae), three kinds of landbird (including an endemic subspecies of the Malagasy white-eye) and its own species of hissing cockroach.

Climate
Europa Island's climate is affected by the Agulhas Current with water temperatures usually above , southeast trade winds during the (austral) winter and occasional cyclones. The climate can be described as a semi-arid and tropical combination with wet summers and dry winters.

History 
While the island has probably been sighted by navigators since at least the 16th century, it takes its name from the British ship Europa, which visited it in December 1774. Ruins and graves on Europa island attest to several attempts at settlement from the 1860s to the 1920s.  For example, the French Rosiers family moved to the island in 1860, but subsequently abandoned it.

References

Further reading

External links 

Mozambique Channel
Indian Ocean atolls of France
Atolls of Madagascar
Uninhabited islands of France
Uninhabited islands of Madagascar
Disputed islands
Territorial disputes of France
Territorial disputes of Madagascar
Islands of the French Southern and Antarctic Lands
Important Bird Areas of the Scattered Islands in the Indian Ocean
France–Madagascar relations
Ramsar sites in France
Seabird colonies